A joint snake is a legendary creature of the Southern United States, the myth likely having spread elsewhere. Supposedly, the joint snake can break itself (or be cut) into pieces and will reassemble itself. It is said that if a piece of the snake is taken and the pocket knife used to cut the snake is set down in the place of the snake's piece, the knife will join up with the whole of the snake.

Explanations 
The myth is probably based on legless lizards that can regenerate their tails after they are broken off. Such lizards are often called joint, or, more commonly, glass snakes. According to travelers' accounts, their skin is as hard as parchment and as smooth as glass. It is so stiff that it can hardly bend itself. It is streaked with  black and white.

Depictions 

A joint snake symbolizes the American colonies in Benjamin Franklin's 1754 political cartoon, "Join, or Die".

Notes

American folklore
Fearsome critters